Blencogo is a small farming village and former civil parish near Wigton in Cumbria, England. It is situated on the Solway Plain in the Allerdale Borough Council area, off the B3502 Wigton to Silloth road. The village is a centre for growing  osier willow for basketmaking and related crafts. In 1931 the parish had a population of 139.

Etymology
Armstrong, et al. cite Ekwall,
who "derives this name from Welsh 'blaen' 'top'...and 'cog' 'cuckoo' to which was later added ON 'haugr' 'hill' ". However, they say that it is more probable that the final element "is the British plural inflexion (Welsh '-au', Cornish '-ow', Breton '-ou')."
 So, ' hill of the cuckoo or cuckoos'.('ON' is Old Norse; 'British' is Common Brittonic).

History
Blencogo first appears in literature around 1100 CE when the Lord Waltheof of Allerdale gives the barony of Blencogo to Odard de Logis. Numerous land transfers are made to Holme Cultram Abbey in over the next 150 years. Land transfers and grants for Blencogo also appear in the patent and charter rolls for Edward III (1342), Richard II (1388), Henry IV (1399), Henry VI (1426), Edward IV (1474), and Henry VII (1543).
	
Blencogo was formerly a township in Bromfield parish, from 1866 Blencogo was a civil parish in its own right until it was abolished on 1 April 1934 and merged with Bromfield.

Notable residents
Jonathan Boucher (1738-1804), born here

See also
Listed buildings in Bromfield, Cumbria
List of places in Cumbria

References

External links

  Cumbria County History Trust: Blencogo (nb: provisional research only - see Talk page)
Blencogo Village website
Willow growers' website

Villages in Cumbria
Former civil parishes in Cumbria
Allerdale